Maciej Marek Hunia (born on 25 February 1961), is a Polish government officer of special services, including the Office of State Protection and the Internal Security Agency, and a Brigadier General of the Civil Intelligence. In 2008 he was the head of the Military Intelligence Service, and was the head of the Foreign Intelligence Agency from 2008 to 2015.

Biography

Maciej Hunia was born in Krakow on 25 February 1961.

In 1986 he graduated from the Faculty of Philosophy and History of the Jagiellonian University. He was active in the Independent Students' Association. He practiced mountain climbing and met Konstanty Miodowicz during this period.

At the end of the 1980s, he completed his military service. In 1990, he became an officer in the delegation of the State Protection Office in Kraków. He held the positions of an analyst, and from 1993 to 1997, he was the deputy head and head of the counterintelligence department in this delegation. From 1997 to 2006 he was the director of the Counterintelligence Board at the Office for State Protection, and then headed the Counterintelligence Department at the Internal Security Agency.

In 2004, President Aleksander Kwaśniewski appointed Hunia to the rank of brigadier general in the ABW corps.

In 2007 he was a diplomat (counselor) at the Polish Embassy in Prague. On 16 January 2008, Hunia took the office of the head of the Military Intelligence Service, previously (from 29 November 2007) he was the deputy of the then head of the SWW Witold Marczuk. On 7 June 2008, he was the head of the Foreign Intelligence Agency. On 11 August 2008, he was dismissed from the position of the head of the SWW and at the same time appointed to the position of the head of the AW, which he held until 19 November 2015.

In May 2015, Hunia was one of the Polish people sanctioned by Russia during the Russo-Ukrainian War.

References

1961 births
Living people